The Periodic Table is a 1975 short story collection by Primo Levi, named after the periodic table in chemistry. In 2006, the Royal Institution of Great Britain named it the best science book ever.

Content
The stories are autobiographical episodes based on the author's experiences as a Jewish-Italian doctoral-level chemist under the Fascist regime in Italy and afterwards. They include various themes that follow a chronological sequence: his ancestry, his study of chemistry and practising the profession in wartime Italy, a pair of imaginative tales he wrote at that time, and his subsequent experiences as an anti-Fascist partisan, his arrest and imprisonment, interrogation, and internment in the Fossoli di Carpi and Auschwitz camps, and postwar life as an industrial chemist. 

Each of the twenty-one stories in the book bears the name of a chemical element as its title and has a connection to the element in some way.

Chapters
"Argon" – The author's childhood, the community of Piedmontese Jews and their language 
"Hydrogen" – Two children experiment with electrolysis
"Zinc" – Laboratory experiments in a university
"Iron" – The author's adolescence, between the racial laws and the Alps
"Potassium" – An experience in the laboratory with unexpected results
"Nickel" – Inside the chemical laboratories of a mine
"Lead" – The narrative of a primitive metallurgist (fiction)
"Mercury" – A tale of populating a remote and desolate island (fiction)
"Phosphorus" – An experience on a job in the chemical industry
"Gold" – A story of imprisonment 
"Cerium" – Survival in the Lager
"Chromium" – The recovery of livered varnishes 
"Sulfur" – An experience on a job in the chemical industry (apparently fiction)
"Titanium" – A scene of daily life (apparently fiction)
"Arsenic" – Consultation about a sugar sample
"Nitrogen" – Trying to manufacture cosmetics by scratching the floor of a hen-house
"Tin" – A domestic chemical laboratory
"Uranium" – Consultation about a piece of metal
"Silver" – The story of some unsuitable photographic plates
"Vanadium" – Finding a German chemist after the war
"Carbon" – The history of a carbon atom

Bibliography
First American edition, New York, Schocken Books, 1984 
 (hardcover)
 (trade paperback)
Reissues
Random House hardcover edition, September 1996 
Knopf Publishing Group paperback edition, April 1995 

Adaptations
The book was dramatised for radio by BBC Radio 4 in 2016. The dramatisation was broadcast in 12 episodes, with Henry Goodman and Akbar Kurtha as Primo Levi.

Notes and references

See also
 
 

1975 short story collections
Short story collections by Primo Levi
Periodic table in popular culture
Giulio Einaudi Editore books
Schocken Books books